Vishavan is an unclassified Dravidian language spoken by a tribal people of central Kerala in India.

VIshavan is a tribal community of Kerala, they are settled in Idamalyar region of Ernakulam District and Vazhachal region of Thrissur District. As per the government records they are endangered but they are still living these area. A study titled Tribes of Idamalyar by Dr.Midhun K S proves their cultural and linguistic ethnicity. This book also discusses how vishavans are unlisted in government records.

References

Dravidian languages
Languages of Kerala
Unclassified languages of Asia

Tribes of Idamalyar, Dr.Midhun K S